The 1970 America's Cup was held in September 1970 at Newport, Rhode Island. The US defender, Intrepid, skippered by Bill Ficker, defeated the Australian challenger, Gretel II, skippered by James Hardy, four races to one.

Intrepid had beaten Heritage and Valiant to become the defender. (1962 winner Weatherly also participated in the trials, providing a fourth boat so racing could proceed more uniformly.) Gretel II had beaten France to become the challenger.

References

 
1970
America's Cup
America's Cup
12-metre class
America's Cup
America's Cup
Sailing competitions in the United States